"Hawaii Aloha," also called "Kuu One Hanau," is a revered anthem of the native Hawaiian people and Hawaii residents alike. Written by the Reverend Lorenzo Lyons, (1807-1886), also known as Makua Laiana, a Christian minister who died in 1886, to an old hymn, "I Left It All With Jesus," composed by James McGranahan (1840-1907),  "Hawai‘i Aloha" was considered by the Hawaii State Legislature in 1967 and by the Hawaii State Constitutional Convention in 1978 to become the official state song, but "Hawaii Pono‘ī," written by King David Kalākaua and composed by Royal Hawaiian Band Master Henri Berger, was chosen instead.

"Hawaii Aloha" is typically sung in both small and large, formal and informal gatherings, both in Hawaii and abroad, while participants stand in a circle with joined hands. It is a feature of the inauguration of the Governor of Hawaii (called Ke Kiaaina), and the opening sessions of the Hawai‘i State House of Representatives and Hawaii State Senate. Traditionally, the last chorus is sung with hands raised above heads; the act of raising hands is especially important to advocates of the Hawaiian sovereignty movement.

{| border=0 |
|
E Hawaii e kuu one hānau e
Kuu home kulaīwi nei 
Oli nō au i nā pono lani ou 
E Hawaii, aloha ē
||
O Hawaii, O sands of my birth 
My native home 
I rejoice in the blessings of heaven 
O Hawaii, aloha.
|-
|
   Hui: 
E hauoli e nā ōpio o Hawaii nei 
Oli ē! Oli ē!
Mai nā aheahe makani e pā mai nei 
Mau ke aloha, no Hawaii
||
   Chorus: 
Happy youth of Hawaii 
Rejoice! Rejoice! 
Gentle breezes blow 
Love always for Hawaii.
|-
|
E hai mai kou mau kini lani e 
Kou mau kupa aloha, e Hawaii 
Nā mea ōlino kamahao no luna mai 
E Hawaii aloha ē 
   (hui)
||
May your divine throngs speak 
Your loving people, O Hawaii 
The holy light from above 
O Hawaii, aloha. 
   (chorus)
|-
|
Nā ke Akua e mālama mai iā oe 
Kou mau kualono aloha nei 
Kou mau kahawai ōlinolino mau 
Kou mau māla pua nani ē 
   (hui)
||
God protects you 
Your beloved ridges 
Your ever glistening streams 
Your beautiful flower gardens. 
   (chorus)
|}

Listen to an excerpt: (The Rose Ensemble) https://www.youtube.com/watch?v=jS3DcFwPsac

Hawaiian music
Symbols of Hawaii
Songs about Hawaii
Year of song unknown